Retzer is a surname. Notable people with the surname include:

George Retzer (1883–1979), American wrestler
Ken Retzer (1934–2020), American baseball player
Michael Retzer (born 1946), American politician and diplomat
Otto Retzer (born 1945), Austrian actor, producer and director
Raoul Retzer (1919–1974), Austrian actor 
Stephan Retzer (born 1976), German ice hockey player